St. Florian Monastery is an Augustinian monastery in the town of Sankt Florian, Austria. Founded in the early ninth century, and later refounded by Augustinians in the eleventh century, St. Florian is the largest monastery in Upper Austria, and rivals Melk Abbey and Klosterneuburg Monastery as among the most impressive examples of Baroque architecture in Austria. The monastery is dedicated to Saint Florian, whose fourth century grave lies beneath the monastery.

History
The monastery, named after Saint Florian, was founded in the Carolingian period. Since 1071 it has housed a community of Augustinian Canons, and is thus is one of the oldest operational monasteries in the world following the Rule of St. Augustine.

Between 1686 and 1708 the monastery complex was reconstructed in Baroque style by Carlo Antonio Carlone, whose masterpiece is St. Florian's. After his death, Jakob Prandtauer continued the work. The result is the biggest Baroque monastery in Upper Austria. Bartolomeo Altomonte created the frescoes.

Construction of the library wing began in 1744, under Johann Gotthard Hayberger. The library comprises about 130,000 items, including many manuscripts. The gallery contains numerous works of the 16th and 17th centuries, but also some late medieval works of the Danube School, particularly by Albrecht Altdorfer.

In 1827, Polish librarian Father Josef Chmel found one of the oldest Polish literary artifacts, an illuminated manuscript containing the Psalms in Latin, German and Polish in the monastery.  Because of the site of discovery, it has been named the Sankt Florian Psalter, and now resides in the National Library of Poland.

In January 1941, the Gestapo seized the facility and expelled the monks. From 1942, the Reichsrundfunkgesellschaft ("Radio Society of the Third Reich"), under general director Heinrich Glasmeier, operated from here.  The canons returned after the end of the war.

The premises now also house the Upper Austrian Fire Brigade Museum.

Basilica

The canons' church was elevated to a basilica minor in 1999. It is dedicated to Saint Florian and Saint Augustine.

St. Florian's Priory possesses two organs, the larger one of which is known as the "Bruckner organ" (Brucknerorgel) and contains four manuals, 103 stops and 7,343 pipes. It was played by composer and organist Anton Bruckner, previously a choir boy at the monastery, when he was the organist, between 1848 and 1855. He is buried beneath the organ inside the church.

List of provosts from 1382 
 Stephan Zainkgraben, officiated 1382–1407
 Jodok I. Pernschlag, officiated 1407–1417
 Kaspar I. Seisenecker, officiated 1417–1436
 Lukas Fridensteiner von Maur, officiated1436–1459, bekam 1458 von Papst Pius II. (1458–1464) das Recht der Pontifikalien
 Johann II. Stieger, officiated 1459–1467
 Kaspar II. Vorster, officiated 1467–1481
 Peter II. Sieghartner, officiated 1481–1483
 Leonhard Riesenschmied, officiated 1483–1508
 Peter III. Maurer, officiated 1508–1545, resigned
 Florian Muth, officiated 1545–1553
 Siegmund Pfaffenhofer, officiated 1553–1572
 Georg I. Freuter, officiated 1573–1598
 Vitus (Veit) Widmann, officiated 1599–1612, died 20 January 1612
 Leopold I. Zehetner, born ca. 1581 in Gemering, officiated 1612–1646, died 30 September 1646 in St. Florian
 Matthias Gotter, officiated 1646–1666
 David Fuhrmann, born 1621 in Straubing, officiated 1667–1689, died 6 Oktober 1689 in Linz
 Matthäus I. von Weißenberg, born 1644 in Steyr, officiated 1689–1700, died 1700 in St. Florian
 Franz Klausius (Clausius) Kröll, officiated 1700–1716
 Johann III. Födermayr, officiated 1716–1732
 Johann Georg II. Wiesmayr, born 4 April 1695, officiated 1732–1755
 Engelbert II. Hofmann, officiated 1755–1766
 Matthäus II. Gogl, officiated 1766–1777
 Leopold II. Trulley, officiated 1777–1793
 Michael I. Ziegler, born 22 February 1744, officiated 1793–1823, died 5 May 1823 in St. Florian
 Michael II. Arneth, geb. 9. January 1771, amtierte als Propst 1823–1854, died 24 March 1854 in St. Florian
 Friedrich (Theophil) Mayer, born 4 October 1793 in Stockheim, officiated 1854–1858, died 29 December 1858 in Rom
 Jodok II. Stülz, born 23 February 1799 in Bezau, officiated 1859–1872
 Ferdinand Moser, born 8 November 1827 in Gmunden, officiated 1872–1901, died 29 October 1901 in St. Florian
 Josef Sailer, born 9 September 1839, officiated 1901–1920, died 29 January 1920 in St. Florian
 Vinzenz Hartl, born 6 December 1872 in Herzogsdorf, officiated 1920–1944, died 10 April 1944 in Pulgarn
 Leopold Hager, born 1 November 1889 in St. Gotthard, officiated 1944–1968, resigned 1968, died 24 February 1972
 Johannes Zauner, born 1913 in Walding, died 24 September 1977, officiated 1968–1977
 Wilhelm Neuwirth, born 12 March 1941, officiated 1977–2005
 Johann Holzinger, born 12 April 1951, officiated since 2005

St. Florian Boys Choir
St. Florian is also known for the St. Florian Boys Choir (St. Florianer Sängerknaben), a boys' choir founded in 1071. This choir has been a traditional part of the monastic worship from its foundation. It still has particular responsibility for sacred music for the priory, but also now undertakes international concert tours, television appearances and making CDs.

Selected discography 
 Franz Farnberger, Anton Bruckner in St. Florian – Requiem & Motetten, St. Florianer Sängerknaben - CD: Studio SM D2639 SM 44, 1997 (with Bruckner's Magnificat & Psalm 22)
 Gunar Letzbor, Franz Joseph Aumann - Requiem, St. Florianer Sängerknaben, Ars Antiqua Austria - CD: Pan Classics PC 10234, 2008 (with Aumann's Ecce quomodo moritur justus, Tenebrae factae sunt and Te Deum)
 Gunar Letzbor, Joseph Balthasar Hochreither - Requiem; Missa Jubilus sacer. St. Florianer Sängerknaben, Ars Antiqua Austria - CD: Pan Classics PC 10264, 2014

Gallery

References
Notes

Citations

Bibliography

External links

 Stift St. Florian official website
 St. Florian Boys Choir official website

Augustinian monasteries in Austria
Monasteries in Upper Austria
Basilica churches in Austria
Tourist attractions in Upper Austria